TWELVE Midtown was to be a 746 ft. (228m) tall skyscraper in Atlanta, Georgia. It was planned to have 58 floors. The construction project has since been cancelled.

See also
List of tallest buildings in Atlanta

External links
Twelve Hotels & Residences

References

Skyscrapers in Atlanta
Unbuilt buildings and structures in the United States